Avaran may refer to:

 Avaran, Qusar, a village in Azerbaijan

See also 
 Eleazar Avaran, a Biblical figure
 Awaran (disambiguation), places in Pakistan
 Abaran (disambiguation)